The 2013 Coleman Vision Tennis Championships was a professional tennis tournament played on outdoor hard courts. It was the fifteenth edition of the tournament which was part of the 2013 ITF Women's Circuit, offering a total of $75,000 in prize money. It took place in Albuquerque, New Mexico, United States, on September 16–22, 2013.

WTA entrants

Seeds 

 1 Rankings as of September 9, 2013

Other entrants 
The following players received wildcards into the singles main draw:
  Samantha Crawford
  Hsu Chieh-yu
  Asia Muhammad
  Maria Sanchez

The following players received entry from the qualifying draw:
  Brooke Austin
  Kristina Barrois
  Sachia Vickery
  Caitlin Whoriskey

The following players received entry into the singles main draw as lucky losers:
  Tori Kinard
  Nicole Melichar

Champions

Singles 

  Shelby Rogers def.  Anna Tatishvili 6–2, 6–3

Doubles 

  Eleni Daniilidou /  Coco Vandeweghe def.  Melanie Oudin /  Taylor Townsend 6–4, 7–6(7–2)

External links 
 2013 Coleman Vision Tennis Championships at ITFtennis.com
 Official website

 
2013 ITF Women's Circuit
2013
2013 in American tennis